Doug McKeon (born June 10, 1966) is an American actor who first achieved notability as a child actor.

Early life and career 
McKeon was born on June 10, 1966, in Pompton Plains, New Jersey, and raised in Oakland, New Jersey, where he attended Indian Hills High School.

McKeon performed in the television series The Edge of Night. He acted in the films Uncle Joe Shannon (for which he was nominated for a Golden Globe Award), On Golden Pond, Night Crossing and Mischief.

Selected filmography

References

Bibliography
 Holmstrom, John. The Moving Picture Boy: An International Encyclopaedia from 1895 to 1995. Norwich, Michael Russell, 1996, p. 360.

External links
Doug McKeon's official website

Doug McKeon at Fandango
Doug McKeon at filmreference.com

1966 births
Living people
American male film actors
American male television actors
American male child actors
American male screenwriters
Male actors from New Jersey
People from Oakland, New Jersey
People from Pequannock Township, New Jersey
University of Southern California alumni
20th-century American male actors
21st-century American male actors
Film directors from New Jersey
Screenwriters from New Jersey